The J.C. Lauber Company Building is a historic building on the east side of South Bend, Indiana. The building was added to the National Register of Historic Places in 1999. The company produced much of the sheet metal and roofing for buildings in early-20th-century South Bend.

History 
Joseph Charles Lauber was born in Hamilton, Ohio, in 1868. His father, Anton, died that same year. Joseph's mother moved the family to Mishawaka, Indiana (a city adjacent to South Bend), to live with her brother, a brewer. As an adult, Joseph became a tinner's apprentice in Michigan. He returned to South Bend in 1890 to work for Meyer & Poehlman, described as "the largest tinsmith and hardware business in the area." In 1890, Lauber left the company to begin his own. What would later be known as the J.C. Lauber Company continued producing speciality metal products throughout the 20th century from several buildings along the 500 block of East LaSalle Avenue on the east side of South Bend.

Among the many buildings the company produced architectural elements for, Lauber produced "galvanized iron work, sheet metal and canopy" for the Palace Theatre, now known as the Morris Performing Arts Center.

In 2016, the building was purchased by the local real estate developer Frank Perri, who owns additional properties on the city's east side.

References 

Buildings and structures in South Bend, Indiana